Soyuz 7 (Union 7) was part of an October, 1969, joint mission with Soyuz 6 and Soyuz 8 that saw three Soyuz spacecraft in orbit together at the same time, carrying a total of seven cosmonauts.

The crew consisted of commander Anatoly Filipchenko, flight engineer Vladislav Volkov and research-cosmonaut Viktor Gorbatko, whose mission was to dock with Soyuz 8 and transfer crew, as the Soyuz 4 and Soyuz 5 missions did. Soyuz 6 was to film the operation from nearby.

However, this objective was not achieved due to equipment failures. Soviet sources later claimed that no docking had been intended, but this seems unlikely, given the docking adapters carried by the spacecraft, and the fact that the Soyuz 8 crew were both veterans of the previous successful docking mission. This was the last time that the Soviet crewed Moon landing hardware was tested in orbit, and the failure seems to have been one of the final nails in the coffin of the programme.

This word is apparently used as the name of an active or aggressive squadron in Soviet military training, and just like Soyuz 4, the Soyuz 7 spacecraft was constructed to be the active or male spacecraft in its docking.

Crew

Backup Crew

Reserve Crew

Mission parameters 
 Mass:  
 Perigee:  
 Apogee: 
 Inclination: 51.65°
 Period: 88.77 minutes

Mission 
The mission objectives included:
 checkout the modified structure of the Soyuz craft,
 further improvement of the control, orientation, and orbital stabilisation systems and navigation aids,
 debugging the piloting systems by orbital maneuvering of the spaceships in relation to one another,
 testing of a system for control of the simultaneous flight of three spacecraft,
 scientific observations and photographing of geological-geographical subjects and exploration of the Earth's atmosphere,
 studying circumterrestrial space,
 conducting experiments of engineering research and biomedical engineering importance.

Return 
The ship was involved in group flight with Soyuz 6 and Soyuz 8. Docking did not occur, and the ship landed 5 days after launch, at 155 km at the northwest of Karaganda, Kazakhstan.

References 

Crewed Soyuz missions
Spacecraft launched in 1969
1969 in the Soviet Union
Spacecraft which reentered in 1969